Beta scission is an important reaction in the chemistry of thermal cracking of hydrocarbons and the formation of free radicals. Free radicals are formed upon splitting the carbon-carbon bond.  Free radicals are extremely reactive and short-lived. When a free radical in a polymer chain undergoes a beta scission, the free radical breaks two carbons away from the charged carbon producing an olefin (ethylene) and a primary free radical, which has two fewer carbon atoms.

In organic synthesis, beta scission can be used to direct multistep radical transformations. For example, beta-scission of a weak C-S bond was used to favor one of two equilibrating radicals in metal free conversion of phenols to aromatic esters and acids via C-O transposition.

References

Reaction mechanisms